Sven-Olov Martin "Esso" Larsson (born 24 May 1938) is a retired Swedish runner. He competed in the 5,000 m event at the 1964 Summer Olympics, but failed to reach the final.

References

1938 births
Living people
Swedish male middle-distance runners
Olympic athletes of Sweden
Athletes (track and field) at the 1964 Summer Olympics